The 1st Pakistan International Screen Awards, known as PISA 2020, was an award ceremony held on 7 February 2020 at the Coca-Cola Arena in Dubai.
 
Parey Hut Love won the most awards for a film, with 5 wins, while Meray Paas Tum Ho was most award-winning TV series by 7 wins.

Winners and nominees 
Nominees for PISA 2020 were announced on 24 January 2020. Voting was done for the awards and there was no jury. Winners are listed first, highlighted in boldface.

Films 
{| class=wikitable
|-
| style="vertical-align:top; width:50%;"|

 Parey Hut Love – Shaiban Haq, Shahbaz Shigri and Mehrunisa Azhar
 Superstar – Momina Duraid
 Baaji – Saqib Malik and  Angeline Malik
 Laal Kabootar – Kamil Cheema and Hania Cheema
 Wrong No. 2 – Sh Amjad Rasheed and Hassan Zia
 Heer Maan Ja – Hareem Farooq, Imran Raza Kazmi and Arif Lakhani
 Chhalawa – Wajahat Rauf
Durj – Dodi Khan and Sherry Shah
| style="vertical-align:top; width:50%;"|

 Asim Raza – Parey Hut Love
 Mohammed Ehteshamuddin – Superstar
 Saqib Malik – Baaji
 Azfar Jafri – Sherdil
 Wajahat Rauf – Chhalawa
 Kamal Khan – Laal Kabootar
|-
| style="vertical-align:top; width:50%;"|

 Sheheryar Munawar – Parey Hut Love as Shehreyar
 Mikaal Zulfiqar – Sherdil as Harris
 Bilal Ashraf – Superstar as Sameer 
 Ahmed Ali Akbar – Laal Kabootar as Adeel
 Ali Rehman Khan – Heer Maan Ja as Kabir
 Azfar Rehman – Chhalawa as Sameer
 Shamoon Abbasi – Durj as Gul
| style="vertical-align:top; width:50%;"|

 Mahira Khan –Superstar as Noori
 Meera – Baaji as Shameera
 Hareem Farooq – Heer Maan Ja as Heer
 Mehwish Hayat – Chhalawa as Zoya
 Maya Ali – Parey Hut Love as Saniya
 Mansha Pasha – Laal Kabootar as Aaliyah
 Sherry Shah – Durj as Laali
 Amna Ilyas – Baaji as Neha
|-
| style="vertical-align:top; width:50%;"|

 Ahmad Ali Butt – Parey Hut Love as Arshad
 Osman Khalid Butt – Baaji as Rohail
 Ali Kazmi – Superstar as Shaan
 Asad Siddiqui – Chhalawa as Luqman
 Hassan Niazi – Sherdil as Arun
 Rashid Farooqui – Laal Kabootar as Ibrahim
| style="vertical-align:top; width:50%;"|

 Zara Noor Abbas –Parey Hut Love as Shabbo
 Zara Noor Abbas –Chhalawa as Haya
 Ayesha Omer –Kaaf Kangana as Gulnaz
 Alizeh Shah –Superstaras Chutki
|-
| style="vertical-align:top; width:50%;"|

 Salman Razzaq – Parey Hut Love Khizer Idrees – Superstar
 Asrad Khan – Chhalawa
 Rana Kamran – Heer Maan Ja
 Mo Azmi – Laal Kabootar
| style="vertical-align:top; width:50%;"|

 Baari – Bilal Saeed and Momina Mustehsan Dhola Coke Studio – Aima Baig and Sahir Ali Bagga
 Ghalat Fehmi – Asim Azhar
 Wohi Khuda Coke Studio – Atif Aslam
 Baari by Bilal Saeed – Momina Mustehsan
 Haye Dil Bechara hy – Jimmy Khan
 Chhalawa – Jabar Abbas
 Chal Raha Houn Coke Studio – Umair Jaswal
 Laila o Laila – Ali Zafar and Urooj Fatima
 Ravi – Sajjad Ali
 Faryad – Abida Parveen
Raat – Shyraa Roy
|-
| style="vertical-align:top; width:50%;"|

 "Chal Raha Hoon" – Umair Jaswal "Dhola" – Aima Baig and Sahir Ali Bagga
 "Ghalat Fehmi" – Asim Azhar
 "Wohi Khuda Hai"Coke Studio – Atif Aslam
 "Baari" – Bilal Saeed  and Momina Mustehsan
 "Haye Dil Bechara" – Jimmy Khan
 "Chhalawa" – Jabar Abbas
 "Baari" – Bilal Saeed and Momina Mustehsan
 "Laila O Laila" – Ali Zafar and Urooj Fatima
 "Ravi" – Sajjad Ali
 "Faryad" – Abida Parveen
| style="vertical-align:top; width:50%;"|

 Azaan Sami Khan – Superstar''' Saad Sultan and Azaan Sami Khan – Parey Hut Love Taha Malik – Baaji Shiraz Uppal – Chhalawa Sahir Ali Bagga – Kaaf Kangana|}

 Television 

 Fashion 

 Social media 

 Lifetime Achievement 

 Controversies 
PISA Awards has been described as a "fraud scam". Nabeel Zafar of Bulbulay'' criticized PISA and told that his name was being used to promote the event. He also revealed that the organizers stopped communicating before the events and tickets were not given to him. Along with Nabeel, there were more than forty celebrities faced the same issue. Many other celebrities such as Osman Khalid Butt, Nadia Afgan, and many others criticized PISA.

PISA was also criticized for having no jury. This award ceremony was described as one of the worst Pakistani award ceremonies.

References

External links
 PISA 2020 on Facebook

Pakistani television awards
Pakistani film awards
Pakistan International Screen Awards
International Screen Awards
Pakistan International Screen Awards
Pakistan International Screen Awards
Pakistan International Screen Awards
Pakistan International Screen Awards